The 2012 Volta a Portugal is a men's road bicycle race held from 15 to 26 August 2012. It is the 74th edition of the men's stage race to be held, which was established in 1927. A part of the 2012 UCI Europe Tour, it is rated as a 2.1 event.

Schedule

Participating Teams
In total, 17 teams are set to compete.
National teams:
Carmim-Prio
Efapel-Glassdrive
LA-Antarte
Onda
Portuguese National Team
International teams:

Team Bonitas

Classification leadership

References

External links

2012
Volta a Portugal
Volta a Portugal